= Sex reassignment =

Sex reassignment may refer to:

- Sex reassignment, changing the sex assignment of an infant or child by parents and doctors, usually because of an intersex condition or trauma
- Sex reassignment, changing the sex characteristics of an older child or adult as part of a gender transition
- Sex reassignment therapy, any medical procedures regarding gender reassignment of both transgender and intersexual people
- Sex reassignment surgery, surgical procedures by which a person's physical appearance and function of their existing sexual characteristics are changed to that of another sex
